This is a list of works by Bhaktivinoda Thakur (1838-1914), a Gaudiya Vaishnava theologian and reformer. This list includes his original works, commentaries on canonical Vaishnava texts, and articles in periodical Sajjana-toshani.

 Hari-katha: Topics of Lord Hari, 1850
 Sumbha-Nisumbha-yuddha, 1851
 Poriade, 1857–58
 Mathas of Orissa, 1860
 Vijana-grama, 1863
 Sannyasi, 1863
 Our Wants, 1863
 Valide Rejishtri, 1866
 Speech on Gautama, 1866
 The Bhagavat: Its Philosophy, Its Ethics, and Its Theology, 1869
 Garbha-stotra-vyakhya, 1870
 Reflections, 1871
 Thakura Haridasa, 1871
 The Temple of Jagannatha at Puri, 1871
 The Monasteries of Puri, 1871
 The Personality of Godhead, 1871
 A Beacon of Light, 1871
 Saragrahi Vaishnava, 1871
 To Love God, 1871
 The Atibadis of Orissa, 1871
 The Marriage System of Bengal, 1871
 Vedantadhikarana-mala, 1872
 Datta-kaustubham, 1874
 Dutta Vansa Mala, 1875
 Bauddha-vijaya-kavyam, 1878
 Sri Krishna-samhita, 1879
 Sri Sajjana-toshani, (monthly magazine) 1881
 Kalyana-kalpataru, 1881
 Review of Nitya-rupa-samsthapanam, 1883
 Visva-Vaishnava-Kalpatari, 1885
 Dasopanishad-curnika, 1886
 Bhavavali (commentary), 1886
 Rasika-ranjana, (commentary on Bhagavad Gita) 1886
 Sri Caitanya-sikshamrita, 1886
 Prema-pradipa, 1886
 Published Sri Vishnu-sahasra-nama, 1886
 Bhajana-darpana-tika(translation and commentary of Manah siksa), 1886
 Sri Caitanya-Upanishad (commentary), 1887
 Sri Krishna-vijaya (published), 1887
 Vaishnava-siddhanta-mala, 1888
 Sri Amnaya-sutram, 1890
 Siddhanta-darpanam (Bengali translation), 1890
 Sri Navadvipa-dhama-mahatmya, 1890
 Sri Godruma-kalpatari (essays on nama-hatta), 1891
 Vidvad-ranjana (commentary on Bhagavad Gita), 1891
 Sri Harinama, 1892
 Sri Nama, 1892
 Sri Nama-tattva-siksastaka, 1892
 Sri Nama-mahima, 1892
 Sri Nama-pracara, 1892
 Sriman Mahaprabhura Siksa, 1892
 Tattva-vivekah or Sri Saccidanandanubhutih, 1893
 Saranagati, 1893
 Gitavali, 1893
 Gitamala, 1893
 Soka-satana, 1893
 Nama-bhajana, 1893
Bhaktyaloka
 Tattva-sutram, 1894
 Vedarka-didhiti (commentary on Sri Isopanishad), 1894
 Tattva-muktavali or Mayavada-satadushani, (translated and published), 1894
 Amrita-pravaha-bhashya (commentary on Caitanya caritamrita), 1895
 Sri Gauranga-lila-smarana-mangala-stotram, 1896
 Sri Ramanuja-upadesa, 1896
 Jaiva-Dharma, 1896
 Sri Caitanya Mahaprabhu, His Life and Precepts, 1896
 Prakshini (commentary on Brahma-samhita), 1897
 Sri Goloka-mahatmya (Bengali translation of Brihad Bhagavatamrita), 1898
 Sri Krishna-karnamritam (translation), 1898
 Piyusha-varshini-vritti (commentary on Upadesamrita), 1898
 Asvada-vistarini-bhasa (translation and commentary on Krishna bhajanamrta), 1899
 Sri Navadvipa-bhava-taranga, 1899
 The Hindu Idols, 1899
 Sri Harinama-cintamani, 1900
 Sri Bhagavata Arka-marici-mala, 1901
 Sri Sankalpa-kalpadruma (Bengali translation), 1901
 Sri Bhajana-rahasya, 1902
 Sri Prema-vivarta (published), 1906
 Svaniyama-dvadasakam, 1907

References

Hindu texts
Bibliographies by writer
Bibliographies of Indian writers
Religious bibliographies